Nathalie Teppe (born 22 May 1972 in Bourg-en-Bresse, Ain) is a French heptathlete.

She is the younger sister of Agnès Teppe, who threw the discus.

Achievements

Personal bests
200 metres – 25.59 (Brescia 1993)
800 metres – 2:13.43 (Oulu 1997)
100 metres hurdles – 13.72 (0.6 m/s) (Talence 2000)
High jump – 1.85 (Narbonne 1993)
Long jump – 6.19 (-0.1 m/s) (Paris-Charlety 1995)
Shot put – 13.90 (Talence 1998)
Javelin throw – 55.84 (Tomblaine 2006)
Heptathlon – 6396 (Lyon 1994)

References

External links

1972 births
Living people
Sportspeople from Bourg-en-Bresse
French heptathletes
French female javelin throwers
Athletes (track and field) at the 1992 Summer Olympics
Athletes (track and field) at the 2000 Summer Olympics
Olympic athletes of France
World Athletics Championships athletes for France
Mediterranean Games gold medalists for France
Mediterranean Games medalists in athletics
Athletes (track and field) at the 1993 Mediterranean Games
Athletes (track and field) at the 1997 Mediterranean Games
20th-century French women
21st-century French women